The Evangelical Lutheran Church of Eritrea is a Lutheran denomination in Eritrea. It is a member of the Lutheran World Federation, which it joined in 1963. Its president is the Rev. Simon Ghebrekristos.

External links 
Lutheran World Federation listing

Lutheran denominations
Lutheranism in Africa
Lutheran World Federation members